Zard Mausam is a Pakistani drama serial directed by Aabis Raza, based on the Urdu novel Zard Mausam written by Rahat Jabeen and produced by Momina Duraid. It began airing from  3 May 2012 on Hum TV.  'Zard Mausam' is the story of an arrogant girl, Aiman, whose life changes after her mother's death.

Retitled as Suno ik Kahani Badi Purani, it also aired in India on Zindagi.

Plot 

After her mother's death, Aiman is mistreated by her step-mother, and even a reunion with her grandfather does not bring her the happiness she was hoping for.

Aiman is engaged to Affan, but she falls in love with her cousin, Tahir Mehmood. Her father gets her married to his junior colleague Tariq. She continues loving Tahir who has interest in her only for her wealth. There is another kind person in the story called Shahmir, he saves Aiman from Tahir. On getting the truth Aiman decides to tell her husband about Tahir. She does tell him upon which he divorces her.

At the end Aiman has her second marriage with Shahmir.

Cast 
 Sania Saeed as Mehrunnisa
 Faisal Rehman as Waqar ul Hasan
 Sajida Syed
 Mohib Mirza as Tahir Mehmood
 Ayeza Khan as Aiman
 Yasir Shoro as Babar
 Maheen Rizvi as Momal (Momo)
 Anum Fayyaz as Birjees a.k.a. Jojo
 Jahanara Hai as Aiman's mother
 Ubaida Ansari as Suriya
 Amir Qureshi

Casting 

Faysal Quraishi was first approached to play the role of Waqar ul Hasan, but after his rejection Faisal Rehman played the role.

Reception 

A reviewer from Dawn added it among the best serials of 2012, and praised the Saeed's performance. while reviewing it, TV Kahani praised the Saeed's performance and direction, but criticized the writing and slow pace of the series.

References

External links

Pakistani drama television series
Urdu-language television shows
Hum TV original programming
2012 Pakistani television series debuts